Palimna formosana is a species of beetle in the family Cerambycidae. It was described by Kano in 1933.

References

Ancylonotini
Beetles described in 1933